The 1952 AAA Championship Car season consisted of 12 races, beginning in Speedway, Indiana on May 30 and concluding in Phoenix, Arizona on November 11.  There was also one non-championship event in Mechanicsburg, Pennsylvania.  The AAA National Champion was Chuck Stevenson, and the Indianapolis 500 winner was Troy Ruttman. Johnny McDowell was killed at the Milwaukee while qualifying for  the Rex Mays Classic. Joe James died in the San José 100 race.

Schedule and results

  Indianapolis 500 was AAA-sanctioned and counted towards the 1952 FIA World Championship of Drivers title.
  No pole is awarded for the Pikes Peak Hill Climb, in this schedule on the pole is the driver who started first. No lap led was awarded for the Pikes Peak Hill Climb, however, a lap was awarded to the drivers that completed the climb.

Final points standings

Note: The points became the car, when not only one driver led the car, the relieved driver became small part of the points. Points for driver method: (the points for the finish place) / (number the lap when completed the car) * (number the lap when completed the driver)

References
 
 
 
 http://media.indycar.com/pdf/2011/IICS_2011_Historical_Record_Book_INT6.pdf  (p. 295-298)

See also
 1952 Indianapolis 500

AAA Championship Car season
AAA Championship Car
1952 in American motorsport
1952 in sports in Arizona